The teams competing in Group 7 of the 2011 UEFA European Under-21 Championships qualifying competition were Croatia, Cyprus, Norway, Serbia and Slovakia.

Standings

Qualification
 Croatia secured a qualification to the UEFA Play-offs.
 Serbia, Norway and Cyprus are eliminated.

Matches

Goalscorers
There have been scored 64 goals over 20 games, for an average of 3.2 goals per game.

1 goal

References
 UEFA.com

7